Frederick Rexford Job (9 August 1910 – 24 May 1999)  was a former Australian rules footballer who played with Carlton in the Victorian Football League (VFL).

Notes

External links 

Rex Job's profile at Blueseum

1910 births
Carlton Football Club players
Australian rules footballers from Victoria (Australia)
Ararat Football Club players
1999 deaths